Rusty Santos is a record producer and musician based in Los Angeles. He is known for producing, recording, mixing and/or mastering records like Animal Collective’s Sung Tongs and the reissue of Danse Manatee, Panda Bear’s Person Pitch, Born Ruffians’ Red, Yellow & Blue, Owen Pallett's Heartland & In Conflict, DJ Rashad's Welcome to the Chi, Dawn of Midi's "Dysnomia", and many more.

As a musician, he usually mixes his voice and guitar playing with samples. So far Santos has released four solo records and formerly played in The Present.

Career
Rusty Santos grew up in Fresno, California. As a teenager, he met drummer Jesse Lee and both played together from the mid to the late 1990s in punk and hardcore bands. After High School Santos moved to the Bay area and started travelling a lot, being heavily involved with West Coast underground culture and punk scene. When travelling to Berlin, he was introduced to German electronic music like Cluster and Minimal techno which changed his approach to music radically. After that he decided to move to New York City and started making solo tracks.

After making friends with still widely unknown Dave Portner and Noah Lennox from Animal Collective, they asked him to help them with record production. By this means he received attention when Animal Collective's breakthrough Sung Tongs with Santos as producer received a great deal of critical acclaim in 2004. After that he went on tour with Animal Collective in 2004 and mixed their live sound. The band's success was followed by Santos producing and remixing many others, mostly New York related bands like Ariel Pink, Terrestrial Tones, Panda Bear, Jane, Holy Shit, Gang Gang Dance and TV on the Radio. He also appeared on the Grizzly Bear album Horn of Plenty (The Remixes), remixing their song Campfire. In the meantime, he also met Thuy Pham and Miho Aoki and started collaborating on running their New York based record label, United Acoustic Recordings. After self-releasing two solo albums, he also gave his official debut as musician in 2004 with The Heavens, produced by himself and Dave Portner and released on UUAR. Afterwards he started playing new material on live shows with Jesse Lee, which were recorded in March 2006 with Lee and Paul Choe. The result was his second official solo record Eternity Spans, which was released in November 2006.

In the summer of 2007, he started another recording project with Mina Ohashi, which eventually led to Santos, Ohashi and Lee founding the band The Present in April 2008. They released their debut World I See in following June on Lo Recordings and the Japanese label Easel Records. According to Santos, the album was entirely written and recorded in Stream-of-consciousness-style. The Present toured the UK and Europe in the end of 2008 and summer of 2009. In June they released the follow-up The Way We Are.  In 2010, the duo shifted their focus to dance music influenced primarily by Chicago house, ghetto house, juke, and footwork.  They released a collaboration with DJ Rashad in early 2013. In 2015 they released the LP "FSG" is now released on Group Tightener Records followed by the EP "Break the Dawn" on Styles Upon Styles records.

From 2015 - 2019 Santos traveled extensively working in Beijing, China with the bands Chui Wan, producing their albums "The Landscape the Tropics Never Had" and "EYE" for Maybe Mars Records, and mixing the self-titled album by the band Nova Heart.  In Lisbon, Portugal, he met the artist Dino d'Santiago and co-wrote and co-produced with Seiji the song "Nos Funana" for the artist's first album on Sony Portugal.  After that he met the artist LIZZ in Mexico City, co-producing her debut single "Embalao" with Sebastian Sartor for Aftercluv/UMLE.  He co-produced the artist Jackie Mendoza's LovHZ EP and that same year Santos reunited with Noah Lennox recording and co-producing the Panda Bear album "Buoys" released on Domino records.  This was followed in 2019 with the single "playing the long game" that was produced by Santos, Lennox, and Sebastian Sartor.

Discography

Solo
Bad Is Good (2002, self-released)
Outside versus In (2003, self-released)
The Heavens (2004, UUAR)
A Up High/Beloved Below 7-inch (2005, UUAR)
Eternity Spans (2006, UUAR)

The Present
World I See (2008, Lo Recordings, Easel Records)
The Way We Are (2009, Lo Recordings)
FSG (2015, Group Tightener Records)
Break the Dawn (2017, Styles Upon Styles)

References

Record producers from California
Living people
1979 births
Musicians from Fresno, California
Writers from Fresno, California
Singer-songwriters from California
21st-century American singers